Hand In Hand (Chinese: 手牵手) is a Singaporean drama produced and telecast on MediaCorp Channel 8. The drama began production in April 2015 and began airing from 25 September 2015. The show aired at 9pm on weekdays and had a repeat telecast at 8am the following day. The series stars Bryan Wong, Jesseca Liu, Seraph Sun and Aloysius Pang and is partly sponsored by the Media Development Authority of Singapore.

Cast

Main cast

Supporting cast

Cameo appearances

Trivia
 This is Bryan Wong's most challenging series to date, as he has to run half-naked along the Marina Bay area (#18), and dangle from a multi-storey car park roof (#01). In the series, Zheng Geping and Ben Yeo will also have topless scenes as well.
Jesseca Liu collaborates with Sora Ma for the third time in this series (the previous two being Yours Fatefully and Blessings), but they are not love rivals this time round.
Stills of the next episode are shown during the ending credits of each episode.
While Hong Meizhi is tracking Meiting in episodes 8 and 15, a passer-by claims he is Star Awards 2015 Best Newcomer Aloysius Pang, the actor who portrayed him.
This was Ben Yeo's first villainous role.
This series repeats its telecast at weekday 5.30pm succeeding C.L.I.F. 3
This series repeats its telecast at weekend 7am in July - Sept 2018 succeeding Absolutely Charming

Awards & Nominations
Hand In Hand is nominated for five award categories in Star Awards 2016, four of which are technical awards and the other is a voting-based award.

Star Awards 2016

See also
 List of MediaCorp Channel 8 Chinese drama series (2010s)
 List of Hand In Hand episodes

References

Singapore Chinese dramas
2015 Singaporean television series debuts
2015 Singaporean television series endings
Channel 8 (Singapore) original programming